A GSM modem or GSM module is a device that uses GSM mobile telephone technology to provide a wireless data link to a network. GSM modems are used in mobile telephones and other equipment that communicates with mobile telephone networks.  They use SIMs to identify their device to the network.

See also 
 Tethering
 Mobile broadband modem

Modems
GSM standard